James Curtis Struble (born 1953) is a former United States ambassador to Peru. Struble is a member of the Senior Foreign Service with the rank of Minister Counselor. He has worked in U.S. embassies in Ecuador, Thailand, Honduras, Spain, Russia and Mexico.

Biography

Struble was born in Visalia, California. He received two B.A. degrees in Russian History and in Slavic Languages and Literature from the University of California, Berkeley in 1975. Between 1988 and 1989 he was a Foreign Affairs fellow at the Hoover Institution in Stanford, California.

Between June 2001 and July 2002, Struble served as Deputy Assistant Secretary in the State Department's Bureau of Western Hemisphere Affairs. In this role Struble was responsible for providing broad policy oversight over U.S.-South American relations. Struble in his role in the State Department has been a vocal opponent of Fidel Castro's regime and has testified before the U.S. House of Representatives Subcommittee on Western Hemisphere Affairs regarding Cuba's jailing of political dissidents which the Cuban government claims were receiving U.S. financing.

On December 9, 2003 was confirmed by the United States Senate to the position of U.S. Ambassador to Peru. On January 16, 2004 was sworn in as U.S Ambassador to Peru, and presented his credentials on 4 February 2004. On January 25, 2006 after Venezuelan President Hugo Chávez announced his support for Peruvian Presidential candidate Ollanta Humala Struble was quoted as saying "[Chávez] should let presidents take care of their countries, and the best thing for the region is Chávez taking care of managing his country" and went on to reprimand Venezuela's actions in the Latin American region.

References

 

Living people
University of California, Berkeley alumni
Ambassadors of the United States to Peru
1953 births
People from Visalia, California
United States Department of State officials
United States Foreign Service personnel